Andrew Exum is an American scholar of the Middle East, a former U.S. Army officer. He was a part of General Stanley McChrystal's review of the American strategy in Afghanistan.

Life
After graduating from The McCallie School in Chattanooga, Tennessee (1996) and the University of Pennsylvania (2000), where he was a columnist for the Daily Pennsylvanian, a member of Sigma Nu fraternity, and a member of the Sphinx Senior Society. Exum, a U.S. Army officer, led a platoon of light infantry in Afghanistan following the September 11, 2001 attacks and subsequently led a platoon of Army Rangers as a part of special operations task forces in Kuwait and Afghanistan with the rank of captain. He was commissioned as an officer through the University of Pennsylvania's Army ROTC program, which he initially joined as a means of financing his education there. He graduated in 2000 with a Bachelor of Arts in classics and English literature. He is a veteran of Operation Anaconda. He earned a master's degree in Middle Eastern Studies at the American University of Beirut. In 2006–2007, Exum was a Soref fellow at the Washington Institute for Near East Policy.  He later studied towards a doctorate from the Department of War Studies, King's College London.

Blake Hounshell of Foreign Policy calls Exum, "one of the sharpest Middle East analysts around."

While still on active duty, but "laid up with a non-combat knee injury," Exum wrote his first book, This Man's Army: A Soldier's Story from the Front Lines of the War on Terrorism.

On May 30, 2008, Exum revealed himself to be the founder of the blog Abu Muqawama (Arabic: أبوالمقاومة for "father or expert of the Resistance"). This blog, "dedicated to following issues related to contemporary insurgencies," was followed by many notable students and practitioners of counterinsurgency in the military, academia, and the media. It has also been referred to as Small Wars Journal's "rogue cousin" partially due to the large overlap in topics and participants and due to its ability to initiate a discussion about topics that are not yet appropriate for the more professional forum. At the time of the revelation, Exum also announced he was leaving the blog to pursue his research.

Exum became a Fellow of the Center for a New American Security (CNAS). He returned to the blog, now hosted at CNAS, continuing to post under the pseudonym Abu Muqawama. He subsequently began posting under his own name.

He served as Deputy Assistant Secretary of Defense for Middle East Policy in the US Government from 2015 to 2016.

Views
Exum has criticized several strategic elements of the War on Terror. In particular, he is critical of the U.S. government's reliance on private military corporations in Iraq and Afghanistan as well as what he sees as the misuse of drones in eliminating terror targets.

Books
This Man's Army: A Soldier's Story from the Front Lines of the War on Terrorism

References

External links
Exum's CNAS bio
Abu Muqawama Archive of Exum's blog

Middle Eastern studies in the United States
The Daily Pennsylvanian people
Counterinsurgency theorists
Living people
Place of birth missing (living people)
Year of birth missing (living people)
United States Army officers
United States Army personnel of the War in Afghanistan (2001–2021)
American bloggers
Alumni of King's College London
Center for a New American Security